Methodius Qu Ailin (born May 1961) is a Chinese Roman Catholic Bishop of Roman Catholic Diocese of Hunan, China.

Biography
Qu was born in Hengyang, Hunan in May 1961. After the resumption of College Entrance Examination, he graduated from the Hengyang Basic University. He joined the church at the end of 1990. He was accepted to the Central South School of Theological Philosophy in 1991. He studied at the Beijing Theological and Philosophical College between 1992 and 1995. He became a priest in June 1995 and that same year he served as a priest at the Hengyang Catholic Church. He was ordained archbishop in 1999 by Bishop of Roman Catholic Diocese of Hunan Simon Qu Tianxi. On December 19, 2011, he was elected as Bishop of Roman Catholic Diocese of Hunan.

See also

Qu (surname 屈)
Roman Catholic Archdiocese of Changsha

References

1961 births
People from Hengyang
Living people
21st-century Roman Catholic bishops in China